Instinct is the inherent disposition of a living organism toward a particular behavior.

Instinct may also refer to:

 Instincts are, in psychoanalysis, human motivational drives (such as sex and aggression)
 Instinct (magazine), a magazine for gay men
 AMD Instinct, a line of supercomputer accelerators. 
 Samsung M800 Instinct, an Internet-enabled touch-based multimedia mobile phone

Fiction
 Instinct (1930 film), a French drama film
 Instinct (1999 film), a film starring Anthony Hopkins and Cuba Gooding Jr.
 Instinct (2019 film), a Dutch film
 "Instinct" (Dollhouse), an episode of Dollhouse
 "Instinct" (Stargate Atlantis), an episode of Stargate Atlantis
 ""Instinct" (Sanctuary), an episode of Sanctuary
 "Instinct" (Orphan Black), an episode of Orphan Black
 Instinct (Hong Kong TV series), a 1994 Hong Kong television series
 Instinct (TV serial), a 2007 crime drama starring Anthony Flanagan
 Instinct (American TV series), a 2018 American television series
 Team Instinct, a team on Pokémon Go

Music
 Instinct Records, a record label
 Instinct (Iggy Pop album), 1998
 Instinct (Ektomorf album), 2005
 Instinct (Kavana album), 1998
 Instinct (Mandalay album), 2000
 Instinct (Granrodeo album), 2008
 Instinct (As Blood Runs Black album), 2011
 Instinct (Niki and the Dove album), 2012
 The Instinct, an album by Denali, 2003
 Instincts (album), by Romeo Void, 1983
 "Instinct" (song), a 1996 song by Crowded House
 "Instinct", a 1997 song by Sadist from the album Crust
 "Instinction", a 1982 song by Spandau Ballet
 "Instinct", one of two brands of the record label Monstercat